The 2011 WPA World Nine-ball Championship was a professional nine-ball pool tournament held from June 25 to July 1, 2011 at the Al Sadd Sports Club in Doha, Qatar. A series of qualifying tournaments were held from June 21 to 23. It was the 2011 edition of the WPA World Nine-ball Championship, which was first held in 1990. The event was organized by the World Pool-Billiard Association (WPA).

The defending champion was Filipino Francisco Bustamante, who defeated Kuo Po-cheng 13–7 in the final of the 2010 WPA World Nine-ball Championship. Bustamante lost to Dennis Orcollo in the last 32. Japanese player Yukio Akakariyama defeated Ronnie Alcano of the Philippines 13–11 in the final to become the first Japanese world pool champion since 1998, when Takahashi Kunihiko defeated Johnny Archer. The event had a prize fund of $250,000, with the winner receiving $30,000.

Overview
The 2011 WPA World Nine-ball Championship was a professional nine-ball pool championship, organized and promoted by the World Pool-Billiard Association and Matchroom Sport. It was held at the headquarters of the Qatari Billiard and Snooker Federation, in the Al Sadd Sports Club in Doha, Qatar. The championships were held for 128 competitors between June 25 and July 1, 2011. It had 116 invited players, and a series of three qualifying events from June 21 to 23 produced 12 more players.

Matches were played with alternating  as -to-nine . The winner of the  broke for the first rack and every odd-numbered rack thereafter, including the final rack if required. The 128 participants were split into 16 groups of eight, competing in a double-elimination format. When 64 players remained, the event changed to a single-elimination knockout; matches were race-to-11 racks except for the final, which was a race-to-13. The defending champion was Francisco Bustamante, who won the 2010 final against Kuo Po-cheng 13–7.

Prize fund
The event had a prize fund of $250,000. The winner received $36,000, the same as the 2010 championship. The prize money was divided as follows:

 Winner: $36,000
 Runner-up: $18,000
 Semi-finalist: $10,000
 Quarter-finalist: $6,000
 Last 16: $4,000
 Last 32: $2,500
 Last 64: $2,000
 Group stage: $500
 Total: $250,000

Summary

Double-elimination round
The double-elimination stage, consisting of four rounds, took place on June 21–25. Gray led 6–2 at the start of the match, but Reyes tied the score at 7–7. Defending champion Bustamante led fellow Filipino player Caneda Villamor, 5–2. The 2010 runner-up, Kuo Po-cheng, won his first-round match 9–7.

The second day featured first- and second-round matches. The Filipino world number-two Ronnie Alcano and world number-three Antonio Lining defeated Hamzah al-Saeed 9–5 and Liu Cheng-Cheih 9–4, respectively, in the first round. The 1995 champion, Oliver Ortmann, lost his opening match 6–9 to Japanese player Tohru Kuribayashi. Qualifier Mohammad al-Hazmi defeated world number-24 Nguyen Phuc Long, 9–6; he would play Daryl Peach, who defeated Keng Kwang Chan 9–5. Qatar's number-one Mohanna Obaidly lost his first round matches, but defeated Andrew Kong of Hong Kong in the loser's second round. Mark Gray trailed 2–7, but won seven racks in-a-row to win 9–7. Two matches went to a deciding rack; Radosław Babica and Yukio Akakariyama defeated Raymund Faron and Mohammed Al Bin Ali 9–8, respectively.

The third day was devoted to second-round matches. Winners in the winners' bracket advanced to the round of 64, and losers'-bracket winners played the winners'-bracket losers the following day. All Filipino players in the winners' bracket won their matches to advance to the round of 64; WPA world number-one Dennis Orcollo, Reyes, Bustamante, Oliver Medenilla, Jeffery de Luna, Alan Cuartero, Ronnie Alcano and Antonio Lining all won their matches and qualified for the knockout round. The 2006 WPA World Nine-ball Championship winner Alcano had to win a deciding rack to defeat Radosław Babica of Poland, and Cuartero (an overseas Filipino worker in Kuwait) defeated Marcus Chamat of Sweden. Shane Van Boening, one of only two Americans in the tournament, defeated 2005 champion Wu Jia-qing. Wu led 2–0, then went on the hill at 8–6. Van Boening evened the match, and held on to win in the final rack.

The fourth day was devoted to second-round matches in the losers' bracket, with winners progressing and losers eliminated. All home Qatari players were eliminated from contention in the group stage; Mohanna Obaidly was beaten by Konstantin Stepanov 3–9, Taher Hussain lost to  1–9, Waleed Majid was defeated by Hunter Lombardo 8–9, and Fawal Abdulatif lost to Naoyuki Ōi 9–6. The match between Antonio Gabica and Fu Jian-bo finished 9–8. The Qatar-based Gabica had a 6–1 lead, but the Chinese won the next four racks. Gabica was first on the hill, but Fu won the next three racks. Gabica won the deciding rack to advance to the knockout stage. Ko Ping-chung and Kwang Yong exchanged leads in their match until Yong pulled ahead, 7–4. Ko tied the match 7–7, and won next two racks to qualify for the next round. Former two-time world champion Wu Jia-qing was beaten by Mariusz Skoneczny.

Knockout rounds

Early rounds (last 64 to last 16)
 
The tournament changed to single-elimination from June 29 to July 1. The round of 64 was played on June 29, when Efren Reyes was defeated by fellow Filipino Villamor 11–5. Antonio Gabica led Mika Immonen 4–1 and 10–6 when he  in rack 17, allowing Immonen to win the next four racks and go hill-hill. Kuo Po-cheng led Mark Gray 10–6 before Gray won five racks in a row to win, 11–10. Gray drew fellow Brit Chris Melling, who beat Korean Hwang Yong. Francisco Bustamante defeated Sascha-Andrej Tege, 11–4.

In the last 32, played on June 30, Francisco Bustamante was leading 9–4 against Riyan Setiawan when he was reportedly distracted by a press photographer. Setiawan won three of the next four to trail 10–7, but won the next three to take the match to a decider. Bustamante had the break before a safety battle ensued. Riyan scratched, and Bustamante ran out to advance to the last 16. In an all-Filipino match, Carlo Biado led Lee Van Corteza 8–5; Corteza won the next four frames, however, to lead 9–8. In rack 18, Corteza missed a shot at the nine-ball and Biado won the remaining racks to win 11–9.

In the last 16 on June 30, Shane Van Boening (the only American left in the field) led 6–3 against England's Darren Appleton. Appleton tied the match at 6–6, then took the lead 7–6. In the deciding rack, van Boening made a safety in which Appleton studied for ten minutes. Appleton missed, but there was no clear shot as Van Boening studied the ball for several minutes before making the shot and running out for the win. The 2007 champion, Daryl Peach, defeated Ko Pin-yi after trailing 9–7 and winning four racks in a row. Defending champion Francisco Bustamante, who had only five minutes between matches, lost 11–6 to Dennis Orcollo. In other matches, Yukio Akakariyama eliminated Carlo Biado and Tōru Kuribayashi defeated Antonio Lining.

Later rounds (quarter-finals to final)
The quarter-finals to the final were played on July 1, the last day of competition. In the quarter-finals, Dennis Orcollo led 5–0 against Daryl Peach early in the match before winning 11–2. Mark Gray played Shane van Boening and held a 4–0 lead before van Boening won five racks in a row to lead, 5–4. Gray then won the next four racks and led, 10–6. They took their time studying the nine-ball shot, but van Boening made an errant safety which allowed Gray to capitalize and win the match. Tōru Kuribayashi trailed Ronnie Alcano 7–3, but won five of the next six to level the match at 8–8 (which later became 10–10). Kuribayashi broke for the game, but they were locked in a safety battle.

Tanio broke in rack 21, but ran out of position on the eight-ball. He sank the ball, but faced another difficult shot on the nine-ball. Tanio missed, and Akakariyama faced a table-length shot on the nine-ball; he took over ten minutes to study the shot before potting it to win, 11–10.

The first semi-final saw Orcullo face Alcano. Alcano won the first two racks and remained at least two racks ahead throughout, leading 8–4 and 10–6. Orcullo won three racks in a row before Alcano won rack 20 to win, 11–9. After the match, Alcano said that his game had improved since he no longer having a manager; instead, he worked with Filipino boxer Manny Pacquiao: "[A]ll I need is just a little bit of Manny's good fortune and I can win the World Championship. I just have to win one more match." The second semi-final went to a deciding rack between Yukio Akagariyama and Mark Gray. Yukio led 6–2 and 8–3 before Gray won five racks in a row to level the match at 8–8. Gray missed a  shot on the nine-ball in rack 17, allowing Yukio to win that rack and the next to lead 10–8. Gray won the next two racks, and had the break in rack 21. The  scratched on his break, allowing Yukio to clear the table and win 11–10.

The final was played at 7 p.m. local time (GMT+3) as race-to-13 racks, with breaks alternating between Yukio and Alcano. Alcano won the lag and the racks were won on break until rack nine, when Yukio took a 5–4 lead. He won the next frame, after a failed jump shot by Alcano. Breaking to have a three-rack lead, Yukio went  when potting the nine-ball and allowed Alcano to win the rack. Yukio won the next two to take a 9–6 lead, but Alcano won three in a row to tie the match 9–9. In rack 19, Alcano missed an eight-ball shot which traveled the length of the table; Yukio won the next two to lead, 11–9. Alcano tied the match 11–11 with safety play in the next two racks. Breaking in rack 23, Alcano missed a shot on the two-ball into the middle pocket and Yukio ran the rest of the rack. Yukio broke in rack 24, and ran the balls in order to win 13–11.

Knockout stage
The knockout draw for the last 64 stages follows; players in bold are match winners.

Upper half

Section 1

Section 2

Section 3

Section 4

Lower half

Section 5

Section 6

Section 7

Section 8

Quarterfinals onward

Final

References

External links

Live scoring at WPA-pool.com

2011
WPA World Nine-ball Championship
WPA World Nine-ball Championship
International sports competitions hosted by Qatar
Sports competitions in Doha